The 2013–14 California Golden Bears men's basketball team represented the University of California, Berkeley in the 2013–14 NCAA Division I men's basketball season. This was head coach Mike Montgomery's sixth and final season at California. The Golden Bears played their home games at Haas Pavilion and participated in the Pac-12 Conference.  They finished the season 21–14, 10–8 in Pac-12 play (which included a home victory against #1 ranked Arizona) to finish in a five way tie for third place. They lost in the quarterfinals of the Pac-12 tournament to Colorado. They received an at-large bid to the 2014 National Invitation Tournament where they defeated Utah Valley in the first round and Arkansas in the second round before losing in the quarterfinals to SMU.

Off-season

Departures

Recruiting class

Roster

Schedule

|-
!colspan=12 style="background:#010066; color:#FFCC33;"| Exhibition

|-
!colspan=12 style="background:#010066; color:#FFCC33;"| Non-conference regular season

|-
!colspan=12 style="background:#010066;"| Pac-12 regular season

|-
!colspan=12 style="background:#010066;"| Pac-12 tournament

|-
!colspan=12 style="background:#010066;"| NIT

Source

See also
2013–14 California Golden Bears women's basketball team

References

External links
CalBears.com 

California
California Golden Bears men's basketball seasons
California
California Golden Bears men's basketball
California Golden Bears men's basketball